BC Borisfen, also known as Borisfen Mogilev (in Belarusian: Барысфэн Магілёў; in Russian: Борисфен Могилёв), is a Belarusian basketball club based in Mogilev. It plays in the Belarusian Premier League and played in the European North Basketball League until it was suspended.

History
The club was established on 3 September 2010. The club was founded after BC Temp-OSHVSM disappeared from the highest Belarusian basketball league. In 2011, Borisfen played in the Belarusian Second League for one season.

In the 2016–17 season, Borisfen made its debut in the Baltic Basketball League. Domestically, in 2018 and 2019, Borisfen finished as runners-up behind BC Tsmoki-Minsk. In the 2019–20 season, Borisfen made its debut in a European competition, playing in the qualifying rounds of the FIBA Europe Cup. The team lost to BC Dnipro.

Borisfen qualified for the regular season of the 2020–21 FIBA Europe Cup., but due to the discovery of COVID-19 in one of the members of the delegation, the team was unable to participate in the games and was sent to quarantine.

In 2021, in the fourth match in the final series, BC Borisfen lost to BC Tsmoki-Minsk by a score 52:85. Thus, BC Borisfen - four-time vice-champion of the Belarusian Basketball Championship. Also, on July 16, it became known that several players left the team, namely: Dupree McBrayer, Darol Hernandez-Zinenko, Tywain МcКee, Brooks DeBisschop and Anton Zaretsky.

In the 2021/2022 season, the club planned to compete in the newly formed European Northern League, where the opponents would also be: Anwil Wloclawek, Basket Brno, BK Liepaja, Enisey Krasnoyarsk, BK Siauliai, Tartu Ulikool Maks and Moorits and BC Valmiera GLASS VIA. The European North Basketball League has excluded BC Borisfen and BC Enisey from the competition from March 1, 2022 due to the war against Ukraine.

European record

 Borisfen withdrew from the 2020–21 FIBA Europe Cup after players on the team were diagnosed with COVID-19.

Players

Current roster

References

External links
Official website
VK.com profile

Basketball teams in Belarus
Mogilev
Basketball teams established in 2010